He is Risen can refer to:

A paschal greeting at Easter
"He is Risen" (The Sopranos), an episode of the television series The Sopranos